The 2017 Monaghan Senior Football Championship was the 111th edition of Monaghan GAA's premier gaelic football tournament for senior clubs in County Monaghan, Ireland. Ten teams competed, with the winner representing Monaghan in the Ulster Senior Club Football Championship. The championship began with a back door system for the first two rounds before becoming knock-out.

Scotstown were the defending champions after they defeated Clontibret O'Neills in the 2016 final to claim a "2-in-a-row" of S.F.C. titles, and they successfully defended their crown when defeating Magheracloone Mitchel's in this season's final.

Donaghmoyne returned to the senior grade after a 1-year absence since being relegated in 2015. Killanny Geraldine's returned to the top flight after a 31-season exodus since relegation in 1985 when claiming the Intermediate Football League in 2016.

Kilanny Geraldines and Donaghmoyne Fontenoys were relegated to the I.F.C. for 2018 after finishing 10th and 9th in the S.F.L. respectively. They will be replaced by I.F.C. and I.F.L. champions Carrickmacross Emmets as well as I.F.L. runners-up Inniskeen Grattans.

Team Changes
The following teams have changed division since the 2016 championship season.

To S.F.C.
Promoted from 2016 Monaghan Intermediate Football Championship
 Donaghmoyne Fontenoys  -  (I.F.C. Champions)
 Killanny Geraldines  -  (I.F.L. Champions)

From S.F.C.
Relegated to 2017 Monaghan Intermediate Football Championship
 Carrickmacross Emmets (9th in S.F.L.)
 Doohamlet O'Neills (10th in S.F.L.)

Participating Teams

Preliminary round
Four of the ten senior clubs in a play each other in a random draw. The two winners proceed to Round 1A while the two losers proceed to Round 1B.

Round 1

Round 1A
The six remaining teams are drawn in this round, along with the two Preliminary round winners (who play each other). 
The four winners proceed to Round 2A while the four losers must play in Round 1B.

Round 1B
The losers of the preliminary round (two teams). The losers of Round 1A, but not that fixture which contains the preliminary round winners (three teams). A draw will be made to determine the two pairings, with the fifth team obtaining a bye into Round 2B.

The following teams are eligible to take part in Round 1B -

 Donaghmoyne;

 Monaghan Harps;

 Killanny;

 Castleblayney;

 Clontibret;

Monaghan Harps received a bye into Round 2B.

Round 2

Round 2A
The 4 winners from Round 1A play each other. The 2 winners proceed to the semi-finals while the losers must play in Round 3B.

Round 2B
The 2 winners from Round 1B play and the 2 teams who received byes through Round 1B play in this round. The 2 winners proceed to Round 3B while the losers exit the championship.

Round 3B
The 2 winners from Round 2B play against the 2 losers from Round 2A. The 2 winners proceed to the semi-finals while the losers exit the championship.

Semifinals
The 2 winners from Round 2A play against the 2 winners from Round 3B.

Final

See also

 2017 AIB Ulster Senior Club Championship
 2017 AIB GAA Football All-Ireland Senior Club Championship

References

Monaghan Senior Football Championship
Monaghan Senior Football Championship